My Sister and I (Swedish: Min syster och jag) is a 1950 Swedish comedy film directed by Schamyl Bauman and starring Sickan Carlsson, Gunnar Björnstrand and Elof Ahrle. It was shot at the Centrumateljéerna Studios in Stockholm. The film's sets were designed by Arthur Spjuth.

Cast
 Sickan Carlsson as Katarina Hassel / Birgitta Hassel  
 Gunnar Björnstrand as Architect Gunnar Stenwall  
 Elof Ahrle as Julius Jöhs  
 Nils Ericsson as Baron Pontus von Goosen  
 Olof Winnerstrand as Baron Baltzar von Goosen  
 Carin Swensson as Maria, Housemaid  
 Cécile Ossbahr as Irene Jöhs  
 Per Grundén as Baron Göran von Kullenberg  
 Marianne Gyllenhammar as Liselotte Renning 
 Anna-Lisa Baude as Selma Jöhs 
 Axel Högel as Jönsson, Servant 
 Bellan Roos as Cook at Colibri  
 Birger Sahlberg as Karlsson  
 Håkan von Eichwald as Pianist at Colibri  
 Gunnel Wadner as Waiter  
 Chris Wahlström as Birgit, Disher at Colibri

References

Bibliography 
 Per Olov Qvist & Peter von Bagh. Guide to the Cinema of Sweden and Finland. Greenwood Publishing Group, 2000.

External links 
 

1950 films
1950 comedy films
Swedish comedy films
1950s Swedish-language films
Films directed by Schamyl Bauman
Films based on works by Louis Verneuil
Films scored by Ralph Benatzky
Swedish black-and-white films
1950s Swedish films